Alejandro Alonso (14 August 1952 – 31 January 2022) was a Mexican Christian guitar player, singer and composer.

Life and career

Early years 
Alonso was born on August 14, 1952, in his grandfather's house in Querétaro, Mexico. He began his musical career at a very early age.  During his teen years he was the lead guitarist in a number of bands playing in pubs and popular Mexican nightclubs.  He was greatly influenced by B.B. King, Eric Clapton, Larry Carlton, Santana and others.  He quickly learned to play the bass, drums and some piano, as well.

Conversion to Evangelicalism 
In 1971 Alejandro had a born again experience and committed his life to Jesus Christ.  Immediately, he began composing his own material and developing his vocal skills. In 1972, he married artist and flautist, Pamela Alonso. They had three children together; Alicia, Job and Rebekah.

From 1973 to 1980, he dedicated a great deal of time to using his music as an evangelistic tool performing at colleges, universities, open-air concerts and prisons.

Maranatha! Years 
In 1980 he moved to California and began working with Calvary Chapel and Maranatha! Music. It was with Maranatha! that he made his first recordings and became one of the innovators of Spanish Christian Contemporary music.

He toured extensively in Latin America and took the music to war zones and areas of guerrilla activity. He also dedicated much time to Bible study and began pastoring Hispanic groups in different churches.

Relocation to South America 
In 1986 he moved with his family to Chile, South America, to do missionary work, but he later returned to California and continued working on a variety of musical projects and pastoring churches.

In 1995 Alonso moved with his family to Buenos Aires, Argentina to do missionary work. After one year they relocated to Santiago, Chile.  There he founded a church and continued working there for seven years. He traveled extensively during that time performing extensively in many countries all over the world.

Later life and death 
In 2001 he returned to California where he lived until his death. He was latterly the pastor of Iglesia Maranatha Chapel, San Marcos, California. He died on 31 January 2022, at the age of 69.

Albums 
Alonso recorded nine solo albums; seven in the Spanish language, one in English and one instrumental. He won awards and was recognized as one of the most influential Spanish Christian contemporary musicians.

Cántico de Libertad – Song of Freedom (1982) 
This was Alonso's first solo music production and was recorded in 1982. It is considered a classic and initiated a fresh style in Spanish Christian contemporary music. It has inspired many Christian singers and musicians who are internationally renowned today. It was produced by Kenneth Nash and includes the talents of Andy Narrel, Ray Oviedo, Paul Contos and Paul Van Wageningen.

Alguien – Someone (1992) 
Alonso considered this production to be his master work. It was produced by Alonso and includes contributions from Abraham Laboriel, Alex Acuña, Justo Almario, John Schriener, Bob Somma and Alfy Silas.

Tu Santidad Me Envuelve – Your Holiness Surrounds Me (1994) 
This album is more on the acoustic side with a touch of gospel-blues. It has become one of Alonso's most popular albums. It was produced by Alonso and with the participation of L.G. Burger, Gary Metz, Julie Worthey, Patty Hamilton, Pamela Alonso and Pat Berrón.

Todo Lo Que Respira – Let all that Hath Breath... (1997) 
This album of praise and worship songs is primarily directed toward younger people. It also includes some traditional hymns. The rhythms vary between blues-gospel, ballad and interesting Latin rhythms. Produced by Alonso and with the participation of Pamela Alonso, Adreas Redel, Marianela Abate, Jenny Brito, and Zuzuki Delpero.

Heme Aquí – Here am I (1999) 
Contains two songs by singer-songwriter Dave Messenger. It was produced by Alonso and includes the participation of Pamela Alonso, Sebastián Almarza, Marianela Abate, Jenny Brito, and Viviana Martinez.

De Regreso a Casa – Coming Home (2001) 
All of the songs on this album are his own compositions with the exception of the last song which is an old hymn (Solid Rock). Alonso and his wife Pamela produced this project together.

Joyful Noise (2002) 
Alonso's first instrumental album. It combines a blend of Latin and South American rhythms with a touch of contemporary jazz.

Scars of Love (2007) 
Alonso's last production. It was released in both English and Spanish versions. This album includes the musical talents of Pamela Alonso, Jonathan Amabilis and Josué Puga.

Other Projects 
Alonso was also featured as part of the vocalists performing in the Spanish version of Maranatha's Praise Series Quiero Alabarte. The same vocal ensemble recorded a Spanish album (Te Alabaré) as Voces de Calvary Chapel.

References

External links 
Official Site
Poiema Records
premiosarpa.com
Alejandro's Bible Studies (audio)
Christian Videos
godtube.com
 
Interview with the Union Tribune Newspaper

1952 births
2022 deaths
Mexican guitarists
Mexican male guitarists
Mexican Christians
Mexican performers of Christian music
People from Querétaro